John Rogers (28 August 1888 – 1 July 1963) was a British stage and film actor active in American cinema. A character actor, he played a number of supporting roles in the 1930s. These grew increasingly smaller during the 1940s were he was often uncredited. His final handful of appearances were in television during the 1950s. He was often cast in London-set productions, including Raffles and Charlie Chan in London.

Selected filmography

Film

 Behind That Curtain (1929)
 The Sea Wolf (1930)
 Raffles (1930)
 Old English (1930)
 Charlie Chan Carries On (1931)
 Limehouse Blues (1934)
 Charlie Chan in London (1934)
 Grand Canary (1934)
 Jane Eyre (1934)
 Long Lost Father (1934)
 Wharf Angel (1934)
 A Feather in Her Hat (1935)
 People Will Talk (1935)
 Charlie Chan at the Race Track (1936)
 Klondike Annie (1936)
 Love Before Breakfast (1936)
 Think Fast, Mr. Moto (1937)
 Bulldog Drummond Comes Back (1937)
 The Buccaneer (1938)
 A Christmas Carol (1938)
 Mysterious Mr. Moto (1938)
 Typhoon (1940)
 The Devil's Pipeline (1940)
 Mutiny in the Arctic (1941)
 The Undying Monster (1942)
 Lassie Come Home (1943)
 The Canterville Ghost (1944)
 Alaska (1944)
 The Suspect (1944)
 Dangerous Intruder (1945)
 Moss Rose (1947)
 Forever Amber (1947)
 Les Miserables (1952)
 Loose in London (1953)

Television
 China Smith (1952, 1 episode)
 Front Page Detective (1952, 1 episode)
 The Adventures of Jim Bowie (1957, 1 episode)

References

Bibliography
 Hardy, Phil. The BFI Companion to Crime. A&C Black, 1997.
 Keaney, Michael F. Film Noir Guide: 745 Films of the Classic Era, 1940-1959. McFarland, 2003.
 Kear, Lynn & Rossman, John. The Complete Kay Francis Career Record: All Film, Stage, Radio and Television Appearances. McFarland, 2016.
 McKay, James. Ray Milland: The Films, 1929-1984. McFarland, 2020.

External links

1888 births
1963 deaths
British male stage actors
British male film actors
Actors from Manchester
British emigrants to the United States